Don Klosterman is the head women's soccer coach at the University of Nebraska Omaha. He has served as the soccer coach there since 1999, compiling a 219-119-21 record at the helm, including the 2005 NCAA Division II National Championship. He is a two time national coach of the year winner. He has guided the Mavericks to a 19–5 NCAA tournament record and a 68–11 mark in North Central Conference play. He has led the Mavericks to six North Central Conference championships.

He started his career as the junior varsity head soccer coach of Creighton Prep High School where he served from 1977 to 1979. From 1979 to 1983 he served as the head soccer coach at Benedictine. From 1984 to 1987, he served as the head men's soccer coach at Creighton University. He compiled a 17-30-3 record at the helm.

External links
https://web.archive.org/web/20110715022215/http://www.omavs.com/coaches.aspx?rc=401

Creighton Bluejays men's soccer coaches
Living people
Year of birth missing (living people)
American soccer coaches
Soccer players from St. Louis
Benedictine Ravens men's soccer players
College women's soccer coaches in the United States
Association football defenders
Omaha Mavericks coaches
Association football players not categorized by nationality
High school soccer coaches in the United States